Khuni Shikder is a 2004 Bangladeshi biographical crime thriller film. The film directed by Monowar Hossain Khokon and produced by Abdul Alim under the banner of Monowara Films. It feature Shakib Khan as the title role, who became a psycho after the death of his mother and then started killing one after another and subsequently he became the country's top terrorist and serial killer. Nodi, Liton Hashmi, Sohail and Mamun Shah and others have also played supporting roles in the film. The film is based on the biography of the Bangladeshi notorious murderer Ershad Sikder and was released on November 15, 2004 on the occasion on Eid-ul-Fitr.

Although the film has been criticised at various times for its obscenity, but also has been widely acclaimed as one of the best performances of Shakib Khan's career.

Synopsis
Shahjahan Shikder (Shakib Khan) is a thief by profession. He lived in a village with his sick mother and made a living by stealing small things. After being caught stealing several times, the villagers decided to bury him alive. When his mother (Rasheda Chowdhury) tried to stop it, she died in front of Shahjahan's eyes. Repentant Shahjahan lost his mental balance and became a psycho and became angry and killed Imam of the village for the first time and left for the town. Coincidentally, he joined a local terrorist group and started terrorist activities. Shahjahan Shikder's only wish is to build a Taj Mahal like Emperor Shahjahan. Once he assassinated the leader of a terrorist group in one night and took the title of "Boro Dada" (trans: Big Grandfather). And subsequently involved in activities such as hated like kidnapping, murder, robbery, rape. Everyone trembled in fear of him.

Cast
 Shakib Khan as Shahjahan Shikder / Boro Dada
 Nodi as Rani, stage dancer and Shikder's love interest; Shikder forced her to marry him
 Liton Hashmi as Choto, Shikdar's faithful companion; subsequently he became the main witness against Shikder
 Pichchi Sohail as Maruf, Police inspector
 Megha as Kajal
 Mamun Shah as Imran, A lawyer
 Urmila as Sumona
 Rasheda Chowdhury as Shikder's mother
 Anna as Akbar, a political party's central leader
 Jugantor Chakma as China

Soundtrack
The film's soundtrack is composed by Ahmed Kislu and all the songs have been written by Moniruzzaman Monir. One of the most popular and famous song "Ami To More Jabo" written and composed by Abdus Sattar Mohanta also used in the film.

References

External links

 
 Khuni Shikder on YouTube

2004 films
Bengali-language Bangladeshi films
2000s Bengali-language films
Bangladeshi action films
2004 action films
Bangladeshi crime thriller films
Bangladeshi biographical films
Biographical films about gangsters
2004 crime thriller films
Films scored by Ahmed Kislu